Euphorbia ambovombensis is a species of plant in the family Euphorbiaceae. It is endemic to Madagascar. It is native to the area around Ambovombe at the southern end o the island, where it is locally common. Its natural habitats are subtropical or tropical dry forests and subtropical or tropical dry shrubland. It is threatened by habitat loss.

Trade in this species is regulated under Appendix I of CITES.

References

 Rauh, W. 1987. New and little known euphorbias from Madagascar Cact. Succ. J. (Los Angeles) 59(6): 251–255

Endemic flora of Madagascar
Flora of the Madagascar spiny thickets
ambovombensis
ambovombensis
Vulnerable plants
Taxonomy articles created by Polbot